Vittorio De Seta (15 October 1923 – 28 November 2011) was an Italian cinema director and screenwriter, considered  Italian cinema's great imaginative realists of the 1960s.

Biography 
He was born in Palermo, Sicily, to a wealthy family, and studied architecture in Rome, before deciding to become a director.

De Seta made ten short documentaries between 1954 and 1959, before directing his first feature-length film, Banditi a Orgosolo (Bandits of Orgosolo).

His early documentaries focus on the everyday life of many of Sicily's poorest workers, and are notable for their lack of voice-over narration, quiet mood, and striking color.

In 2005 the rediscovery of Vittorio De Seta's work was a highlight of Tribeca Film Festival and Full Frame Documentary Film Festival, where Détour De Seta, a documentary on the Italian director was presented.

Filmography 
Banditi a Orgosolo (1961)
Un uomo a metà (1966)
L'invitata (1969)
Diario di un maestro (1972) TV mini-series
Un anno a Pietralata (1974) TV movie
In Calabria (1993)
Lettere dal Sahara (2006)
articolo 23 (2008) Short

Documentaries 
Vinni lu tempu de li pisci spata, 11', 1955
Isole di fuoco, 11', 1955
Sulfarara, 10', 1955
Pasqua in Sicilia, 11', 1955
Contadini del mare, 10', 1955
Parabola d'oro, 10', 1955
Pescherecci, 11', 1958
Pastori di Orgosolo, 11', 1958
Un giorno in Barbagia, 14', 1958
I dimenticati, 20', 1959
Dedicato ad Antonino Uccello, 30', 2003

Awards 
1957. David di Donatello: Targa d'argento.
1961. Best First Work in the Venice Film Festival with Banditi a Orgosolo.
1962. Silver Ribbon of the Best Cinematography B/W at the Sindacato Nazionale Giornalisti Cinematografici Italiani (Italian National Syndicate of Film Journalists) with Banditi a Orgosolo.

Bibliography 
Bibliography
Alessandro Rais (curated by). Il cinema di Vittorio De Seta. Catania, Giuseppe Maimone Editore, 1995. 
Il mondo perduto: i cortometraggi di Vittorio De Seta. 1954-1959, book and DVD. Milan,  Feltrinelli Editore, 2009. 
Paolino Nappi. L'avventura del reale. Il cinema di Vittorio De Seta. Soveria Mannelli, Rubbettino, 2015. 
Documentary
 Détour De Seta. Documentary film. Dir. Salvo Cuccia. Palomar-Endemol, 2004. 57 min.

See also
Il mondo perduto

References

External links 
 

1923 births
2011 deaths
Italian film directors
Italian screenwriters
Film people from Palermo
Italian male screenwriters